The 2009–10 OHL season was the 30th season of the Ontario Hockey League (OHL). Twenty teams played 68 games each during the regular season schedule, which started on September 17, 2009 and ended on March 14, 2010. On September 9, 2009, all 20 teams in the OHL unveiled their new Reebok Edge jerseys, which have been used in the National Hockey League (NHL) from 2007 until 2017. The playoffs began on March 18, 2010, and ended on May 4, 2010, with the Windsor Spitfires winning the J. Ross Robertson Cup for the second consecutive year, which they followed up by winning the 2010 Memorial Cup, hosted by the Brandon Wheat Kings of the WHL in Brandon, Manitoba.

Regular season

Final standings
Note: DIV = Division; GP = Games played; W = Wins; L = Losses; OTL = Overtime losses; SL = Shootout losses; GF = Goals for; GA = Goals against; PTS = Points; x = clinched playoff berth; y = clinched division title; z = clinched conference title

Eastern conference

Western conference

Scoring leaders
Note: GP = Games played; G = Goals; A = Assists; Pts = Points; PIM = Penalty minutes
As of the end of the season, March 14

Leading goaltenders
Note: GP = Games played; Mins = Minutes played; W = Wins; L = Losses: OTL = Overtime losses; SL = Shootout losses; GA = Goals Allowed; SO = Shutouts; GAA = Goals against average

Playoffs

Conference quarterfinals

Eastern conference

(1) Barrie Colts vs. (8) Sudbury Wolves

(2) Ottawa 67's vs. (7) Niagara IceDogs

(3) Mississauga St. Michael's Majors vs. (6) Peterborough Petes

(4) Kingston Frontenacs vs. (5) Brampton Battalion

Western conference

(1) Windsor Spitfires vs. (8) Erie Otters

(2) London Knights vs. (7) Guelph Storm

(3) Kitchener Rangers vs. (6) Saginaw Spirit

(4) Plymouth Whalers vs. (5) Sault Ste. Marie Greyhounds

Conference semifinals

Eastern conference

(1) Barrie Colts vs. (5) Brampton Battalion

(2) Ottawa 67's vs. (3) Mississauga St. Michael's Majors

Western conference

(1) Windsor Spitfires vs. (4) Plymouth Whalers

(2) London Knights vs. (3) Kitchener Rangers

Conference finals

Eastern conference

(1) Barrie Colts vs. (3) Mississauga St. Michael's Majors

Western conference

(1) Windsor Spitfires vs. (3) Kitchener Rangers

J. Ross Robertson Cup

(E1) Barrie Colts vs. (W1) Windsor Spitfires

J. Ross Robertson Cup Champions Roster

Playoff scoring leaders
Note: GP = Games played; G = Goals; A = Assists; Pts = Points; PIM = Penalty minutes

Playoff leading goaltenders
Note: GP = Games played; Mins = Minutes played; W = Wins; L = Losses; GA = Goals Allowed; SO = Shutouts; SV& = Save percentage; GAA = Goals against average

All-Star Classic
The OHL All-Star Classic was played on February 3, 2010, at the K-Rock Centre in Kingston, Ontario.  The game was televised on Rogers Sportsnet.  The Eastern Conference All-Stars defeated the Western Conference All-Stars 17–11. Captains of the All-Star games were Ryan Ellis for the Western Conference and Alex Pietrangelo for the Eastern Conference. Andrew Agozzino of the Niagara IceDogs won the player of the game award as he scored an All-Star Game record four goals and added one assist.  The skills competition was held the night before on February 2, with the Western Conference winning.  Honorary captains for the event were former Toronto Marlboros player Steve Thomas representing the Eastern Conference and former Windsor Spitfires player Adam Graves representing the Eastern Conference.

All-Star teams
The OHL All-Star Teams were selected by the OHL's general managers.

First team
Tyler Seguin, Centre, Plymouth Whalers
Taylor Hall, Left Wing, Windsor Spitfires
Bryan Cameron, Right wing, Barrie Colts
Jake Muzzin, Defence, Sault Ste. Marie Greyhounds
Nick Crawford, Defence, Barrie Colts
Chris Carrozzi, Goalie, Mississauga St. Michael's Majors
Dale Hunter, Coach, London Knights

Second team
Nazem Kadri, Centre, London Knights
Jeremy Morin, Left Wing, Kitchener Rangers
Taylor Beck, Right wing, Guelph Storm
Cameron Gaunce, Defence, Mississauga St. Michael's Majors
Ryan Ellis, Defence, Windsor Spitfires
Matt Hackett, Goalie, Plymouth Whalers
Dave Cameron, Coach, Mississauga St. Michael's Majors

Third team
Luke Pither, Centre, Barrie Colts
Chris MacKinnon, Left Wing, Kitchener Rangers
Greg Nemisz, Right wing, Windsor Spitfires
Alex Pietrangelo, Defence, Barrie Colts
Shawn Lalonde, Defence, Belleville Bulls
Patrick Killeen, Goalie, Brampton Battalion
Marty Williamson, Coach, Barrie Colts

Awards

2010 OHL Priority Selection
On May 1, 2010, the OHL conducted the 2010 Ontario Hockey League Priority Selection. The Sarnia Sting held the first overall pick in the draft, and selected Alexander Galchenyuk from the Chicago Young Americans. Galchenyuk was awarded the Jack Ferguson Award, awarded to the top pick in the draft.

Below are the players who were selected in the first round of the 2010 Ontario Hockey League Priority Selection.

2010 NHL Entry Draft
On June 25–26, 2010, the National Hockey League conducted the 2010 NHL Entry Draft held at the Staples Center in Los Angeles, California. In total, 42 players from the Ontario Hockey League were selected in the draft. Taylor Hall of the Windsor Spitfires was the first player from the OHL to be selected, as he was taken with the first overall pick by the Edmonton Oilers.

Below are the players selected from OHL teams at the NHL Entry Draft.

2010 CHL Import Draft
On June 28, 2010, the Canadian Hockey League conducted the 2010 CHL Import Draft, in which teams in all three CHL leagues participate in. The Sarnia Sting held the first pick in the draft by a team in the OHL, and selected Nail Yakupov from Russia with their selection.

Below are the players who were selected in the first round by Ontario Hockey League teams in the 2010 CHL Import Draft.

See also
 2010 Memorial Cup
 List of OHL seasons
 2009–10 QMJHL season
 2009–10 WHL season
 2009 NHL Entry Draft
 List of OHA Junior A standings
 2009 in ice hockey
 2010 in ice hockey

External links
 Official website of the Ontario Hockey League
 Official website of the Canadian Hockey League
 Official website of the MasterCard Memorial Cup
 Official website of the Home Hardware Top Prospects Game
 Official website of the ADT Canada Russia Challenge
 Official website of the OHL All-Star Classic

References

Ontario Hockey League seasons
4